Le Barcarès is a commune in the Pyrénées-Orientales department in southern France bordering the Mediterranean Sea.

History 
During the mid 19th century, Le Barcarès was created as a small fishing village which developed until the mid- 20th century prior to the local economy redirecting towards the tourism industry 

At the end of the Spanish Civil War, Le Barcarès was the site of a camp housing Republican escapees from Spain. Conditions were slightly better than at other camps, as most internees sent there had indicated a willingness to return to Spain.

Geography

Localisation 
Le Barcarès is located in the canton of La Côte Salanquaise and in the arrondissement of Perpignan.

Government and politics 
Mayors

Population

Notable people 
 Georges Candilis (1913-1995), Greek architect and urbanist who participated to the conception of Port-Barcarès.

See also
Communes of the Pyrénées-Orientales department

References

Communes of Pyrénées-Orientales